Jay Odedra (born 5 November 1989) is an Indian-born cricketer who plays for the Oman national cricket team. In January 2018, he was named in Oman's squad for the 2018 ICC World Cricket League Division Two tournament. He made his List A debut for Oman on 8 February 2018.

In August 2018, he was named in Oman's squad for the 2018 Asia Cup Qualifier tournament. In October 2018, he was named in Oman's squad for the 2018 ICC World Cricket League Division Three tournament.

In December 2018, he was named in Oman's team for the 2018 ACC Emerging Teams Asia Cup. In February 2019, he was named in Oman's Twenty20 International (T20I) squad for the 2018–19 Oman Quadrangular Series in Oman. He made his T20I debut for Oman against Ireland on 13 February 2019.

In March 2019, he was named in Oman's team for the 2019 ICC World Cricket League Division Two tournament in Namibia. In July 2019, he was named in Oman's One Day International (ODI) squad for the 2019 Scotland Tri-Nation Series. He made his ODI debut for Oman, against Papua New Guinea, on 14 August 2019.

In September 2019, he was named in Oman's squad for the 2019 ICC T20 World Cup Qualifier tournament. In November 2019, he was named in Oman's squad for the 2019 ACC Emerging Teams Asia Cup in Bangladesh.

References

External links
 

1989 births
Living people
Omani cricketers
Oman One Day International cricketers
Oman Twenty20 International cricketers
Indian emigrants to Oman
Indian expatriates in Oman
People from Porbandar
Cricketers from Gujarat